The term "Hungarian naming conventions" may refer to:

Hungarian names, names and naming as they are used in Hungary
Eastern name order, the practice of beginning a personal name with the family name and ending with the given name
Hungarian notation, a system used in computer programming